Disney Channel is the Belgian edition based on the American channel of the same name, owned by the Walt Disney Company.

Disney Channel was launched in Flanders on 1 November 2009, as a subfeed from the Dutch version. The Flemish channel was split from the Dutch version in 2012.

For the French part of Belgium, Disney Channel France aired in the country until 29 June 2015, when a French Belgian localized feed was launched.

The Flemish and French feeds have the same schedule with their own ad breaks.

History 
Disney Channel France was launched in Belgium on 31 March 2003 as an option of the digital cable offers with Canal+.

The French Disney channels were added to Belgacom TV on 1 December 2006.

The Dutch Disney Channel was launched on 30 October 2009 on Belgacom TV, and on 1 November on Telenet along with the French channel.

Since 2012, the Flemish and Dutch Disney Channel became two separate versions, each with their own programming.

A French Belgian feed was launched on 29 June 2015, replacing Disney Channel France except in satellite. The French and Flemish feeds have almost the same schedule, they can have differences like TV shows only dubbed in French like Disney Fam Jam.

Disney Channel Belgium is available in HD on all its providers.

Audience share
In 2019, the French feed is the 3rd kids-specialized channel in Southern Belgium for the 4–14 years old range, behind Nickelodeon and Disney Junior, and in front of Cartoon Network and Studio 100 TV. All ages combined, the channel is ranked 14th regionally.

The Flemish feed is the 5th kids-specialized channel in Northern Belgium for the 4–14 years old range, behind Nickelodeon, Nick Jr., Studio 100 TV and Cartoon Network, and in front of Disney Junior, VTM Kids and VTM Kids Jr.

References

Belgium
French-language television stations
Television channels in Flanders
Television channels in Belgium
Television channels and stations established in 2012
2009 establishments in Belgium